Virgílio do Carmo da Silva SDB (born 27 November 1967) is an East Timorese Roman Catholic prelate who was appointed Bishop of Dili on 30 January 2016. He became an archbishop when the diocese was elevated in 2019.

On 27 August 2022, Pope Francis announced he would make him a cardinal, the first from East Timor.

Biography
Virgílio do Carmo da Silva was born on 27 November 1967 in Venilale. He was the son of José do Carmo and Isabel da Silva. After attending Salesian primary and secondary schools in Fatumaca, he joined the Salesians of Don Bosco on 31 May 1990. He then studied in the Philippines, philosophy in Canlubang and theology in Parañaque. On 19 March 1997, he made his perpetual profession and he was ordained a priest on 18 December 1998 in Parañaque.

From 1999 to 2004 and again 2007 to 2014 da Silva was novice master for the Salesians. From 2005 he studied in Rome for a licentiate in spirituality at the Salesian Pontifical University. From 2009 to 2014 he was director of the Technical School of Nossa Senhora de Fátima in Fatumaca. In 2015 he became provincial superior of the Salesians in East Timor and Indonesia.

On 30 January 2016, Pope Francis appointed him bishop of Díli. He replaced Bishop Alberto Ricardo da Silva, who died of brain cancer the previous April. He received his episcopal consecration on 19 March from Archbishop Joseph Marino, Apostolic Nuncio to East Timor, assisted by Bishops Basílio do Nascimento of Baucau and Norberto do Amaral of Maliana. Government officials, including President Taur Matan Ruak, sent congratulations, marking the end of years of contentious relations between the government and religious leaders.

Launching a pilgrimage to key religious sites in East Timor in 2018, do Carmo da Silva said "it is time for the church and government to unite and develop forms of religious tourism that are rich not only on the spiritual side but also in social, economic, cultural and historical aspects." The country has started to develop religious tourism to give the fragile economy a much-needed boost.

In May 2018, police in Díli were placed on high alert after learning of potential attacks by Islamic extremists on churches as well as do Carmo da Silva, after the recent elections in the country.

On 11 September 2019, Pope Francis created the ecclesiastical province of Díli, making Díli a metropolitan archdiocese, and appointed do Carmo da Silva as Timor-Leste's first archbishop.

On 29 May 2022, Pope Francis announced he would make do Carmo da Silva a cardinal. On 27 August, Pope Francis made him a cardinal priest, assigning him the title of Sant'Alberto Magno. 

That week he told an interviewer that East Timor having a Catholic majority had eased reconciliation with Indonesia when East Timor won its independence in 2002. He praised East Timor's endorsement earlier in 2022 of the Document on Human Fraternity signed by Pope Francis and Ahmed el-Tayeb in 2019. He noted the country's efforts to promote religious tourism include representatives of other religions, that there was already a large mosque in Dili and a large Hindu temple is under construction.

See also
 Cardinals created by Pope Francis

References

Additional sources

External links
 

1967 births
Living people
Salesians of Don Bosco
21st-century Roman Catholic bishops in East Timor
People from Baucau District
Roman Catholic bishops of Dili
East Timorese Roman Catholic bishops
Roman Catholic archbishops of Dili
Salesian Pontifical University alumni
East Timorese cardinals
Salesian cardinals
Cardinals created by Pope Francis